Jack Monroe is a British writer and campaigner.

Jack Monroe may also refer to:

Jack Monroe (character), a Marvel Comics character
Jack Monroe (song), a British folk song

See also
John Monroe (disambiguation)
Jack Munro (1873–1948), British trade unionist